SM U-13 was one of the 329 submarines serving in the Imperial German Navy in World War I. U-13 was engaged in the naval warfare and took part in the First Battle of the Atlantic.

She had left Heligoland on 6 August 1914 and was not heard from again. She may have been a victim of the German defensive minefield in Heligoland Bight, or from an accident or mechanical failure.

References

Notes

Citations

Bibliography

External links

World War I submarines of Germany
Type U 13 submarines
1910 ships
Ships built in Danzig
U-boats commissioned in 1912
U-boats sunk in 1914
U-boats sunk by unknown causes
World War I shipwrecks in the North Sea
Ships lost with all hands
Maritime incidents in August 1914